Kevin James O'Brien (10 April 1932 – 24 September 2020) was an Australian rules footballer who played with Carlton in the Victorian Football League (VFL).

Notes

External links 

Kevin O'Brien's profile at Blueseum

Carlton Football Club players
Australian rules footballers from Melbourne
Old Paradians Amateur Football Club players
1932 births
2020 deaths
People from Newport, Victoria